Chilanga may refer to:

Chilanga, El Salvador, a municipality in the Morazán Department of El Salvador
Chilanga (Lusaka), Zambia, a town 20 km south of Zambia's Capital Lusaka
Chilanga (constituency), a parliamentary constituency in Lusaka Province, Zambia
Chilanga, Zambia, a town in Zambia's Northern Province, close to Tanzania
Female version of the Mexican demonym Chilango